For Sampagaon Taluka, see Bailhongal.

Sampagaon is a village in the southern state of Karnataka, India. It is located in the Bailhongal taluka of Belgaum district in Karnataka.

Demographics
As of India's 2001 census, Sampagaon (Bailhongal) had a population of 8936 with 4515 males and 4421 females.

History
The town has an interesting history, Hiremallasetty and Chikkamallasetty were two brave warriors from Adil Shahi kingdom. Adil Shah was pleased with the valour, bravery and honesty of the two brothers and granted them Sardeshmukhi of 6 villages, namely Rayara Hubbali, Sampagaon, Itagi, Hunasikatti, Kadaravalli and HIrebagewadi. On getting the prestigious Sardeshmukhi, they migrated from Shahapur in Gulbarga district in 1585 and settled down at Sampagaon and established their traditional business. They persuaded their kith and kin to come along and settle with them. In due course of time, they cleared the Hongal forest and made it habitable, thereby giving a new name Bailahongala (which means cleared forest). The Kittur kingdom was founded in 1585 by the blessings of Swamiji of Kallumath monastery. Sampagaon / Bailahongala became the capital of the kingdom. Before Kittur town had its present name, it was called Gijaganagudu (nest of bottle birds). Since the capital was shifted from Sampagaon to the present place, it was called Kittur i.e. a shifted city. Kittur kingdom were the Desai's of Adil Shahi Dynasty of Bijapur.

The town used to be the taluka headquarters in place of Bailhongal. The current day town looks to a dry place, although it was once considered to be very beautiful place with lakes and beautiful surroundings.

This was a preferred place under the rule of Adil Shahis. If you look into the region this is the only place in the surrounding to have monuments of Adil Shahi, which goes on to prove their presence in the region for sheer love of the place and surroundings. In fact the water reservoir was mostly demanded by the locals, as per the folklore the area from the mosque to the current lake in the village was a well maintained garden till recent past.

The monument "Shahi Masjd" has amazing architectural beauty. Specially the inner pillar are designed in such a marvelous way the visitor will feel surprised by the design.

See also
 Belgaum
 Districts of Karnataka

References

3. The Queen of Kittur: A Historical Novel by Basavaraj Naikar

External links
 http://belgaum.nic.in/

Villages in Belagavi district